The Metro Atlantic Athletic Conference Men's Basketball Coach of the Year is a basketball award given to the most outstanding men's basketball head coach in the Metro Atlantic Athletic Conference, as chosen by a panel of sports writers and broadcasters. The award was first given following the 1981–82 season, the first year of the conference's existence, to Bob Dukiet of Saint Peter's. Joe Mihalich of Niagara, Ted Fiore of Saint Peter's, and King Rice of Monmouth have won the most awards with three, while five other coaches have won the award twice.

Key

Winners

Winners by school

See also
List of coaches in the Naismith Memorial Basketball Hall of Fame
Metro Atlantic Athletic Conference Men's Basketball Player of the Year

Footnotes

References

NCAA Division I men's basketball conference coaches of the year
Coach of the Year
Awards established in 1982